Daniel Pinto (born 13 May 1967) is a Portuguese Olympic dressage rider. Representing Portugal, he competed at two Summer Olympics (in 2000 and 2008), where he achieved 27th and 33rd positions, respectively, in individual dressage

Daniel also competed at three editions of World Equestrian Games (in 1998, 2002, 2006 and 2010) and at six European Dressage Championships (in 1995, 2001, 2007, 2009, 2015 and 2017). His current best championship result is 6th place in team dressage from the 2017 Europeans held in Gothenburg, Sweden, while his current best individual result is 23rd place from the same event.

Pinto qualified for the 2007 edition of Dressage World Cup final where he finished 12th.

His brother Carlos Pinto is also a Portuguese Olympian in dressage.

References

External links
 
 

Living people
1967 births
Portuguese male equestrians
Portuguese dressage riders
Equestrians at the 2000 Summer Olympics
Equestrians at the 2008 Summer Olympics
Olympic equestrians of Portugal